Pahile Na Mi Tula is an Indian Marathi-language television series. It premiered from 1 March 2021 and aired on Zee Marathi. The show starred Shashank Ketkar, Tanvi Mundle, Aashay Kulkarni in lead roles.

Synopsis 
Manasi, a young woman, works in a company named Lankari Finance where Samar, a business tycoon is the Manager. She loves Aniket, her childhood friend, an MBA graduate but presently working as a taxi driver, due to unavailability of better job. But Samar's constant obsession with her poses a hurdle in their love life but Manasi irrespective of Samar's tortures continues to fight.

Cast

Main 
 Aashay Kulkarni as Aniket; Manasi's husband
 Shashank Ketkar as Samar Pratap Jahagirdar / Vijay Dhavade; Manasi's boss, Lankari Finance's branch manager
 Tanvi Mundle as Manasi Rajan Desai; Aniket's wife, Samar's love interest

Recurring 
 Ram Daund as Rajan Desai; Manasi's father
 Priyanka Tendolkar as Megha Rajan Desai / Megha Satyajeet Wadekar; Manasi's sister
 Sachin Deshpande as Satyajeet Wadekar; Megha's husband
 Iravati Lagoo as Nirmala Rajan Desai; Manasi's mother
 Varsha Dandale as Usha; Aniket's mother
 Santosh Sarode as Mr. Parab; office worker
 Prakash Sawant as Office servant
 Pramod Bansode as Mr. More; office worker
 Sumeet Bhokse as Chaitanya; Aniket's friend
 Manjusha Khetri as Neelam; Manasi's office friend
 Nilpari Khanwalkar as Bharati; Manasi's office friend
 Ananda Karekar as Mr. Bhope; Samar's assistant
 Tejashree Muley as Sangi; Samar's wife
 Sagar Sakpal as Auto driver
 Amit Phatak as Manohar Varghode; Manasi's fiance
 Geetanjali Ganage as Isha; Office Receptionist
 Sanika Kashikar replaced Geetanjali as Isha

Production 
The series premiered on 1 March 2021 and aired on Zee Marathi from Monday to Saturday. The show is produced under the banner of Kothare Vision.

Casting 
Shashank Ketkar first time reprising the negative role as Samar. Tanvi Mundle debutants the role of Manasi and Aashay Kulkarni got the role of Aniket. Sachin Deshpande got the role of Satyajeet and Priyanka Tendolkar got the role of Megha.

Airing history

References

External links 
 Pahile Na Mi Tula at ZEE5
 

Marathi-language television shows
Zee Marathi original programming
2021 Indian television series debuts
2021 Indian television series endings